The 1943–44 Southern Football League was the fourth edition of the regional war-time football league tournament.

Table

References

season
1
Scot